Acacia diastemata, also known as the sandstone pavement wattle, is a shrub to small tree belonging to the genus Acacia and the subgenus Juliflorae that is endemic to a small area of north-western Australia.

Description
It has grey coloured bark with a fibrous texture and glabrous finely ribbed that are brown but become grey with age. Like most species of Acacia it has phyllodes rather than true leaves. The glabrous phyllodes are straight to shallowly incurved and have three widely spaces longitudinal nerves. It flowers between March and June producing yellow flowers.

Distribution
It is native to an area in the east Kimberley region of Western Australia where it has widespread but quite localised populations from around the Prince Regent River in the south west to around the Roe River in the north and to the Drysdale River National Park in the east.

See also
List of Acacia species

References

diastemata
Acacias of Western Australia
Taxa named by Russell Lindsay Barrett
Taxa named by Bruce Maslin
Plants described in 2013
Taxa named by Matthew David Barrett